Heidi Soulsby is a British politician from the island of Guernsey. She has been a deputy of the States of Guernsey since the 2012 Guernsey general election and is the First female Deputy Chief Minister of Guernsey.

Education 
Soulsby graduated with a BSc (Hons) in Geography from King's College London.

Political career 
She was elected to the States of Guernsey in 2012 and 2016.

She founded the Guernsey Partnership of Independents along with Gavin St Pier and Lyndon Trott. She received the second most votes in the 2020 Guernsey general election.

Personal life 
Soulsby lives in Saint Martin with her husband Phil.

References

External links 

 Official website
 Heidi Soulsby on Twitter

Living people
Members of the States of Guernsey
21st-century British politicians
21st-century British women politicians
Alumni of King's College London
People from Saint Martin, Guernsey
Guernsey women in politics
Women government ministers of Guernsey
Year of birth missing (living people)